Indiana County Technology Center is a technical school in Indiana County, Pennsylvania.  The center serves high school and adult students.

Secondary program
ICTC serves high school students from the county's eight Senor High Schools, who spend one-half of the school day at ICTC and the other half at their home school:

Sending high schools
 Blairsville Middle-High School
 Saltsburg Middle-High School
 Homer-Center Junior/Senior High School
 Indiana Area Senior High School
 Marion Center Area High School
 Penns Manor Area Junior/Senior High School
 Purchase Line Junior/Senior High School
 United Junior/Senior High School

Secondary programs
There are 14 program areas at ICTC in five clusters:

Automotive Repair
Carpentry
Masonry
Culinary Arts
Health Occupations
Graphic Design
Cosmetology (including a separate adult cosmetology class)
And more

Career development programs
Career Development programs at ICTC include:
 Cooperative Learning - The student leans hand-on skills while being employed in the community, and is advised by school faculty
 Work-based Learning -Students in this program have job shadowing opportunities and possible unpaid internships

Secondary clubs
There are a variety of clubs available to the student at ICTC, 
 Student Challenge Program
 National Technical Honor Society
 PA Builders Association - Student Chapter
 Skills USA

Adult education
There are programs for adult learners in 31 different programs, as per demand from Commonwealth of Pennsylvania and are tailored to the student's need.

References

Schools in Indiana County, Pennsylvania
Public high schools in Pennsylvania